The Dunhuang Mosque is a mosque in Dunhuang City, Gansu Province, China.

History
The mosque was originally built in the Ming Dynasty and rebuilt in 1917.

Architecture
The mosque consists of a main hall and two side halls. The main hall is located in the west and opposite to the east. The north and south sides of the hall are closed to the main hall. At the back of the main hall, there are two-story building and living room for the imams.

See also
 Islam in China
 List of mosques in China

References

1917 establishments in China
Dunhuang
Mosques in Gansu
Mosques completed in 1917
Ming dynasty architecture